Jay Foreman may refer to:

 Jay Foreman (businessman), American businessman
 Jay Foreman (American football) (born 1976), former American football linebacker
 Jay Foreman (comedian) (born 1984), English musical comedian
 Jay Foreman (darts player) (born 1971), English darts player